The Missing Link is the eighth full-length album released by the heavy metal band Rage in 1993. The album was remastered by Noise/Sanctuary in 2002 with five bonus tracks, three of them are from the EP Refuge.

Track listing

Personnel
Band members
Peter "Peavy" Wagner – vocals, bass, arrangements
Manni Schmidt – guitars
Chris Ephthimiadis – drums

Production
Sven Conquest – producer, engineer, mixing
Bernd Steinwedel – mastering
Karl-Ulrich Walterbach – executive producer

References

1993 albums
Rage (German band) albums
Noise Records albums